Ruben "Balot" Doctora Jr. (born May 17, 1986) is a Filipino footballer who plays for Philippines Football League club Stallion Laguna F.C. as a striker. Doctora is the captain of his club. He has represented the Philippines at the international level.

Club career
On 17 December 2012, Stallion FC defeated Global FC to win the 2012 UFL Cup at the Rizal Memorial Stadium, Manila to a score of 2–1. Doctora and Spanish striker Rufo Sánchez scored one goal apiece to upset previous league champions Global. Doctora also won the Golden Ball award, the tournament’s equivalent to the Most Valuable Player award.

International career
On 3 March 2014, Doctora was included in the starting lineup of the Philippines against Malaysia for a friendly before the 2014 AFC Challenge Cup. On 11 April 2014, Doctora registered his first international goal for the Philippines while playing against the Nepal national football team in a friendly.

International goals
Scores and results list the Philippines' goal tally first.

Honours

Club
Stallion FC
 UFL Division 1: 2013
 United Football League Cup: 2012

Individual
 United Football League Cup Golden Ball: 2012

References

External links
 
 

1986 births
Living people
Filipino footballers
Association football forwards
Philippines international footballers
Stallion Laguna F.C. players
Footballers from Iloilo